Mavis Mill was a cotton spinning mill in Coppull, Chorley, Lancashire

Mavis Mill was built in 1908 alongside the Coppull Ring Mill, which still survives under a change of use to an enterprise centre. The mill was taken over by the Lancashire Cotton Corporation in 1941, but was subsequently demolished to make a car park. The spinning machines were driven by a 2000 hp triple-expansion four-cylinder engine by J & E Wood, 1909, which had a 26 ft flywheel with 36 ropes.

Location 
Coppull is a village and civil parish in Lancashire, England. It is bounded by Whittle Brook, Clancutt Brook, the River Yarrow, Eller Brook, Hic-Bibi Brook and Stars Brook. Coppull is located between Chorley and Wigan, to the east of the A49 road near Charnock Richard. The village was 6 km from the Leeds and Liverpool Canal but was served from 1834 by the North Union Railway.

History 
Coppull expanded greatly along with the rest of Lancashire during the Industrial Revolution of the 18th century. As well as the Cotton industry the town is situated on the Lancashire Coal Field. There were several major collieries located in the town during this era with notable collieries being Chisnall Hall and Ellerbeck.
Mavis Mill, Coppull was built in 1906, with elaborate decoration. It was used to spin 10's to 24's counts for general manufacture.

The industry peaked in 1912 when it produced 8 billion yards of cloth. The great war of 1914- 1918 halted the supply of raw cotton, and the British government encouraged its colonies to build mills to spin and weave cotton. The war over, Lancashire never regained its markets. The independent mills were struggling. The Bank of England set up the Lancashire Cotton Corporation in 1929 to attempt to rationalise and save the industry. Mavis Mill, Coppull was one of 104 mills bought by the LCC, and one of the 53 mills that survived through to 1950.

Architecture

Power 
Driven by a 2000 hp triple-expansion four-cylinder engine by J & E Wood, 1909. At 69 rpm, it had a 26 ft flywheel running 36 ropes. It was steamed at 200psi. Its cylinders, 21"HP, 33"IP and two 37"LP had a 6 ft stroke.

Owners

Coppull Ring Spinning Co
Lancashire Cotton Corporation (1941-1964)
Courtaulds (1964-)

See also 

Textile manufacturing

References

Bibliography

External links
 www.cottontown.org
 www.spinningtheweb.org.uk

Textile mills in Lancashire
Buildings and structures in the Borough of Chorley
Former textile mills in the United Kingdom
Textile mills owned by the Lancashire Cotton Corporation